Fallin' Like Snow is the third full-length album by Jaymay, consisting of thirteen Christmas and other winter-themed original compositions and covers. These recordings, together with thirteen others recorded during the same sessions, were originally released online as a 26-song "advent calendar" for fans, released one per day in December, 2015.

The opening track of the album, "This is a Christmas Song, My Love", was named 2016's "Best Holiday Song" by Blurt.

Track listing
All songs written by Jaymay except where noted.

 "This is a Christmas Song, My Love" – 2:17
 "Winter Wonderland" (F. Bernard, R. Smith) – 2:28 
 "Up in the Sky" – (Jaymay, G. Go) 3:48 
 "For Christ's Sake, Pick Up the Phone!" – 2:59
 "Carol of the Bells" (M. Leontovich, P. Wilhousky) – 1:27 
 "Farewell, New York" – 2:57
 "Up on the Housetop" (B. Hanby) – 2:34 
 "Santa's Little Helper" – 2:29
 "My Evergreen" (T. Maxwell) – 2:37 
 "Silent Night" (F. Gruber, J. Mohr) – 2:46 
 "Little Drummer Girl" (K. Davis, H. Onorati, H. Simeone) – 2:23 
 "Fallin' Like Snow" – 3:51
 "Ave Maria" (traditional) – 3:26

Personnel
Musicians
Jaymay – vox, guitar, electric guitar
Daniel Belardinelli – piano, keyboards, celesta
Taylor McLam – guitars, bass, drums 
David Luther – saxophone
Lara Somogyi – harp
Mike Block – cello
Hanneke Cassel – violin
Alexander MacDonald – tap dance 
Tyler Chester – bass on 2
Gary Go – vox on 3
UCLA Lab School Intermediate kids directed by Nick Kello – vox on 3
Jonathan Monroe – guitar on 6
The City of Prague Philharmonic Orchestra conducted by Paul Bateman
The Manhattan Choral Ensemble directed by Thomas Cunningham – Molly Austin, Matt Borgmeyer, Tom Blanchard, Nancy Brandler, Connie Brooks, Evelyn Chu, Covey Crolius, Tom Davidson, Liz Davis, Alison Dolinger, Dave Erbach, Adam Guzik, Stephanie Hagan, Elizabeth Healy, Erin Hillmar, Greg Johnson, Danielle Marchand, Dan Melius, Laura O'Reilly, David Prestigiacomo, Paola Rekalde, Arden Rogow-Bales, Julie Strauss, Gwen Thompson, Blake Wandesforde, Thomas Wang, Risa Ward, Evelyn Way, Brian Wong
 
Production
Jaymay – producer, arranger, orchestrator
Daniel Belardinelli – producer, arranger, orchestrator
Patrick MacDougall – mixing
Brad Leigh – mixing
Satoshi Mark Noguchi – mixing
Colleen Lutz – engineer assistant
Oscar Zambrano – mastering
Bill Wadman – cover photograph
The City of Prague Philharmonic Orchestra recorded at Smecky Studios, Prague
Jan Holzner – Orchestra Recording Engineer
James Fitzpatrick – Orchestra Contractor & Session Producer
Daniel Clive McCallum - Orchestration
David Krystal, Kevin Smithers – Additional Orchestration & Music Preparation

References

2016 albums
Jaymay albums